Van Andel is a Dutch toponymic surname meaning "from/of Andel", a town in North Brabant. Notable people with the surname include:

Hendrikje van Andel-Schipper (1890–2005), Dutch supercentenarian, oldest Dutch person
 (1877–1972), Dutch Lieutenant general of the Royal Netherlands Army
Jay Van Andel (1924–2004), American businessman, co-founder of the Amway Corporation
Olaf van Andel (born 1984), Dutch rower
Pek van Andel (born 1944), Dutch experimental ophthalmologist and researcher on serendipity
 (1923–2010), Dutch-born American geo-archaeologist and oceanographer

See also
Van Andel Arena, Multi-purpose arena in Grand Rapids, Michigan, named for Jay Van Andel
Van Andel Institute, American biomedical research and science education institute founded by Jay Van Andel

References

Dutch-language surnames
Toponymic surnames